Poppets Town, French title: Les Popilous (also styled as PoppetsTown; Popilouville in French) is a Canadian-Japanese-Catalan animated children's television series produced by Decode Entertainment and Neptuno Films, based on the characters created by Japanese author Jun Ichihara. The series aired on Knowledge Network and TVOKids in Canada.

Synopsis
Poppets Town follows the adventures of Blooter and his best friends Patty and Bobby as they solve everyday problems in Poppets Town.

Characters
 Blooter (voiced by Cory Doran) is a blue dog who wears no clothes and loves to ride his scooter.
 Patty (voiced by Bryn McAuley) is a yellow cat who wears a pink dress with light-colored flowers and a blue bandana and loves to ride her helicopter.
 Bobby (voiced by Cameron Ansell) is an orange bear who wears a yellow shirt with pink polka-dots, rides his van, and carries a camera.
 Cocori (voiced by Julie Lemieux) is a chicken with a pink shirt and blue scarf. She has a red helmet and drives an egg car.
 Alli is an alligator with a red and white striped shirt and a red hat. He rides a ladybug car.
 Cozy (voiced by Adam Reid) is a red and white striped zebra that rides a blue horse.
 Captain Cap (voiced by Adam Reid) is a sheep.
 The Naka-Nakas (voiced by Richard Binsley) are trio of monkeys.
 Mathilda is a bee with orange and red stripes that rides Patapata.
 Candy is a caterpillar of different colors.

Episodes

Broadcast 
In addition to its broadcast in Canada on Knowledge Network and TVOKids, the show has also been broadcast internationally.  Disney Channel Latin America and Disney International have distributed the show for their channels in the Latin America, UK, Spain, Scandinavia, Italy, Australasia and Taiwan. The show aired in the United States on Discovery Familia in 2011. JimJam aired this show in early 2023 in International OLC has distributed the show in Japan.

References

External links

2000s Canadian animated television series
2009 Canadian television series debuts
2009 Spanish television series debuts
2011 Canadian television series endings
2011 Spanish television series endings
Canadian children's animated adventure television series
Spanish children's animated adventure television series
Canadian flash animated television series
Spanish flash animated television series
Canadian preschool education television series
Animated preschool education television series
2000s preschool education television series
English-language television shows
Television series by DHX Media
Animated television series about dogs
Animated television series about cats
Animated television series about bears
Television series about chickens
Fictional crocodilians
Fictional zebras
Animated television series about monkeys
Television series about sheep